The 2013–14 season in English football is the 46th season of the Northern Premier League Premier Division, and the seventh season of the Northern Premier League Division One North and South. 
The League sponsors for 2013–14 are Evo-Stik.

It is the first season after restructuring of the Premier Division into a 24-team league.

Premier Division

The Premier Division featured six new teams:
Barwell, transferred from the Southern League Premier Division
Droylsden, relegated from Conference North
Skelmersdale United, promoted as champions of NPL Division One North
King's Lynn Town, promoted as champions of NPL Division One South
Stamford, promoted via play-offs from NPL Division One South
Trafford, promoted via play-offs from NPL Division One North

League table

Play-offs

Semi-finals

Final

Results

Stadia and locations

Division One North

Division One North will feature four new teams:
Darlington 1883, promoted as champions of the Northern League Division One
Kendal Town, relegated from the NPL Premier Division
Northwich Victoria, transferred from the NPL Division One South
Padiham, promoted as champions of the North West Counties League Premier Division

On 17 April 2014, the NPL announced that Cammell Laird and Wakefield had tendered their resignation from the league, and that they would take up the two relegation spots at the end of the season.

League table

Play-offs

Semi-finals

Final

Results

Stadia and locations

Division One South

Division One South will feature four new teams:
Bedworth United, relegated from the Southern League Premier Division
Eastwood Town, relegated from the NPL Premier Division
Goole, transferred from the NPL Division One North
Scarborough Athletic, promoted as champions from the Northern Counties East League Premier Division

League table

Play-offs

Semi-finals

Final

Results

Stadia and locations

Challenge Cup

The 2013–14 Northern Premier League Challenge Cup is the 44th season of the Northern Premier League Challenge Cup, the main cup competition in the Northern Premier League. It will be sponsored by Doodson Sport for a third consecutive season. 68 clubs from England will enter the competition, beginning with the preliminary round on 3 September.

The defending champions are North Ferriby United, who beat Curzon Ashton on penalties after a 1–1 result in regulation and extra time in the 2013 Final. North Ferriby United will be unable to defend their title as they were promoted to the Conference North after being the 2012–13 NPL Premier Division champions.

Changes from previous cups include the elimination of a round by having the Premier Division teams enter in the first round instead of the third round as in previous years and, instead of going into extra time, all ties in the preliminary through semi-final rounds will end after 90 minutes and conclude with penalties.

Calendar

Preliminary round
Eight teams from the Northern Premier League Division One North or Northern Premier League Division One South had to compete in the preliminary round to win a place in the competition proper. The draw for the preliminary round took place on 9 August 2013.

Source:

First round
Teams that weren't in the preliminary round from Northern Premier League Division One North or Northern Premier League Division One South entered at this stage as well as teams from the Northern Premier League Premier Division, along with the winners from the preliminary round.
The draw for this round was made on 9 August 2013 with the ties originally scheduled to be played 11 to 13 November 2013.

Source:

Second round
The 32 winners from the first round were entered into the second round draw on 14 November 2013. The ties are originally scheduled to be played between 27 November and 4 December.

Source:

Third round
The 16 winners from the second round were entered into the third round draw on 6 December 2013. The ties are originally scheduled to be played 14 or 21 January.  The Brigg Town and Frickley Athletic match was originally played 21 January but was abandoned with Frickley Athletic leading 1–0 after a player was injured.

Source:

Quarter-finals
The 8 winners from the third round were entered into the Quarter-finals draw on 22 January 2014. The ties are originally scheduled to be played 8, 25 February, or 26.

Source:

Semi-finals
The 4 winners from the Quarter-finals were entered into the Semi-finals draw on 26 February 2014, with Carlton Town from the Northern Premier League Division One South remaining as the lowest-placed team still in the Cup. The ties are originally scheduled to be played 11 and 12 March.

Source:

Final
The Challenge Cup Final was played at Edgeley Park, the home ground of Stockport County. This was AFC Fylde's first Final appearance and the second Final appearance for Skelmersdale United (they advanced to the final in 2008 but were defeated by Eastwood Town).  After a 35th-minute goal, AFC Fylde won their first Challenge Cup.

Source:

Peter Swales Shield

For the 2014 edition of the Peter Swales Shield, the 2013–14 champions of the Northern Premier League First Division North, Curzon Ashton, played against the 2013–14 champions of the Northern Premier League First Division South, Halesowen Town.

See also
2013–14 Isthmian League
2013–14 Southern League

References

External links
Official website
Official Northern Premier League Match Photo Gallery

Northern Premier League seasons
7